Paola Nicole Andino (born March 22, 1998) is an American actress known for her lead role as Emma Alonso in the Nickelodeon series, Every Witch Way.

Biography
Andino was born in Bayamón, Puerto Rico, and moved to Dallas, Texas, at the age of three with her parents and brother. As a child, she danced competitively as a member of Lewisville's Footlights Dance Studio; at the age of ten she started taking acting classes with Antonia Denardo at Denardo Talent Ventures in Lewisville. After a guest appearance in an episode of Grey's Anatomy, in 2011 she starred in Hallmark Hall of Fame's movie Beyond the Blackboard. 

In December 2013, she got the role of Emma Alonso, the female lead, in the series Every Witch Way, which started airing in January 2014. Andino went on to guest star in the show's spinoff Wits Academy for 2 episodes. She was also a recurring guest star on Queen of the South. For this role she was nominated as Best Young Actress at the 29th Imagen Awards.

Filmography

References

External links

 

1998 births
American people of Puerto Rican descent
American child actresses
American television actresses
Living people
People from Bayamón, Puerto Rico
Actresses from Dallas
21st-century American actresses